John Nava may refer to:

 John Nava (cyclist), Venezuelan cyclist
 John Nava (painter), American artist